World's Most Amazing Videos was an American reality television series that ran on NBC from March 3, 1999 until 2001, as a filler program when other shows were cancelled and later revived on Spike from 2006 until 2008.

The show showcases accidents, disasters, police chases and other extraordinary events that were caught on video camera.

Until 2007, all episodes of the show were narrated by Stacy Keach. From that point on, the season was narrated by Erik Thompson. The show was broadcast in the United Kingdom on Bravo and Channel One, in which David Wartnaby served as the narrator of the first season followed by Lee Boardman in the second season of broadcast and was expected to return in 2012. In Australia, it is shown on the pay-TV channel Fox8. The series was given its own local name titled Global Shockers in the Philippines that was aired on ABC-5 (now known as TV5) from 2006 until 2007 and it was hosted by Johnny Delgado.

The fifth and final season changed the format; instead of multiple random clips in one episode, each episode now focuses on a certain theme.

Synopsis
These videos normally show anybody involved in these aforementioned incidents surviving nonetheless. Although it is similar in content to other series like Real TV, World's Wildest Police Videos, Maximum Exposure, Most Shocking, Most Daring, Shockwave and Destroyed in Seconds, it took a more serious tone. The clips show some dangerous disasters, daring rescues, fights, amateur sports, robberies, animal attacks, and car accidents.

Episodes

Season 1 (1999)

Season 2 (1999-2001)

Season 3 (2006)

Season 4 (2007)

Season 5 (2008)

Syndication and revival
All of the older episodes of World's Most Amazing Videos (NBC version run only) were re-aired on Spike TV from 2005 to 2008. A new series of episodes of the show were created in 2006 first-run for Spike, after a six-year hiatus from the NBC stint. Also, the show was re-aired on CMT from 2009 to 2010, and Chiller from 2016 to 2017.

Home media releases
From 1999 until 2000, Trimark Home Video (under the label NBC Home Video) released 13 episodes of the first season of the original NBC version  of the show in six volumes on VHS.

On November 4, 2008, Universal Studios Home Entertainment released World's Most Amazing Videos: Volume One that features the first five episodes of the 2006 revival version (Season 3) on DVD in Region 1.

See also
 Destroyed in Seconds
 Most Daring
 Real TV
 Shockwave
 Untamed & Uncut

References

External links
 
 

1990s American reality television series
2000s American reality television series
NBC original programming
Spike (TV network) original programming
1999 American television series debuts
2008 American television series endings
Television series by CBS Studios
Television series by Universal Television
American television series revived after cancellation
1990s American video clip television series
2000s American video clip television series